Sauto halt (French: Halte de Sauto)  is a railway station in Sauto, Occitanie, southern France. Within TER Occitanie, it is part of line 32 (Latour-de-Carol-Enveitg–Villefranche-Vernet-les-Bains, Train Jaune).

References

Railway stations in Pyrénées-Orientales
Railway stations in France opened in 1910